Three Sinners (1928) is a silent film directed by Rowland V. Lee, starring Pola Negri, and co-starring Warner Baxter, Olga Baclanova, and Paul Lukas.

The film was produced by Famous Players-Lasky and distributed by Paramount Pictures, and is based on a play Das Zweite Leben (or The Second Life) by Rudolf Bernauer and Rudolf Österreicher. Director Lee also served as executive producer. A sound remake starring   Ruth Chatterton was titled Once a Lady (1931).

Cast
Pola Negri – Baroness Gerda Wallentin
Warner Baxter – James Harris
Olga Baclanova – Baroness Hilda Brings
Paul Lukas – Count Dietrich Wallentin
Anders Randolf – Count Hellemuth Wallentin (billed as Anders Randolph)
Tullio Carminati – Roul Stanislav
Anton Vaverka – Valet to Dieetrich
Ivy Harris – Countess Lilli
William von Hardenburg – Prince von Scherson
Robert Klein – Count Bogumi Sdarschinsky
Irving Bacon – ?
Delmer Daves – ?

Preservation status
Three Sinners is now considered a lost film.

See also
List of lost films

Production still

Warner Baxter and Pola Negri

References

External links
Three Sinners at IMDB
Three Sinners at SilentEra
Three Sinners at AllMovie
poster of Three Sinners(Wayback)

1928 films
American silent feature films
Films directed by Rowland V. Lee
Lost American films
Famous Players-Lasky films
1928 drama films
Silent American drama films
Films set in Austria
Films set in Germany
American black-and-white films
Lost drama films
1928 lost films
1920s American films